Chauntal Lewis is an American stage and film actress. She started her acting career at the age of five. Since 1995, she has appeared in more than 20 movies and TV series.

Biography
Lewis was born and grew up in Oxnard, California. Her stage career began, when she was five. Her first film role was as Susan's Best Friend Roxanne Strybos in Apollo 13. On March 18, 2009, Lewis was in a car accident and lost her left hand above the wrist. She has continued with her acting career.

Filmography

Film

Television

Video games

References

External links 
 Chauntal Lewis on Facebook
 

American actresses
American amputees
Living people
1984 births
21st-century American women